John Richard Piana (August 6, 1918 – July 10, 2001) was an American professional basketball player. He played for the Detroit Eagles in the National Basketball League for two games during the 1940–41 season – one in the regular season, and one in the postseason. He played college basketball at the University of Detroit Mercy.

References

1918 births
2001 deaths
American men's basketball players
American military personnel of World War II
Basketball players from Detroit
Detroit Eagles players
Detroit Mercy Titans men's basketball players
Forwards (basketball)